Gallion may refer to:

Gallion, Alabama, a community in Hale County, Alabama
Gallion (plant genus), a former genus in the family Rubiaceae

People with the surname
Arthur Gallion (1902–1978), American architect
Bob Gallion (1924–1999), American country music singer
Jérôme Gallion (born 1955), French rugby union player
Josh Gallion (born 1979), American politician
MacDonald Gallion (1913–2007), Alabama Attorney General
Rex Gallion (1915–1975), American country-western guitarist

See also
Galleon, a ship
Gallon, unit of measure